Kosovan-Qatari relations are foreign relations between Kosovo and Qatar. Kosovo declared its independence from Serbia on 17 February 2008 and Qatar recognized it on 7 January 2011.

History
The case of Kosovo War was discussed by members of the Organisation of Islamic Cooperation in Qatar in 1998. On 7 January 2011 Qatar became the 73rd country to officially recognize the independence of Kosovo. Nearly in the same time Qatar voted in favor of Kosovo's membership on the World Bank. In May 2015 Deputy Foreign Minister of Kosovo Petrit Selimi visited Qatar, where he discussed with Qatari officials about existing opportunities to further the cooperation in areas such as economy and education. Some Kosovar young people work in Qatar, mainly in the service sector, attracted by good job opportunities and high salaries. This has caused among parts of Kosovo society concerns about exploitation of young workers in illegal activities.

Notes

References

Kosovo
Bilateral relations of Kosovo